Elaine Allard  (born February 25, 1977)  is a Canadian 1.5 point wheelchair basketball player who won a bronze medal at the 2010 Wheelchair Basketball World Championship in Birmingham, and gold at the 2014 Women's World Wheelchair Basketball Championship in Toronto.

Biography
Elaine Allard was born in Montreal, Quebec on February 25, 1977. She sustained a spinal cord injury in an accident when she was 16. Before her accident she had participated in many sports, most notably swimming and alpine skiing. She works as an account manager at the Royal Bank of Canada. She speaks English, French and Portuguese, and scuba dives. In 2003, she scaled Kala Patthar in the Himalayas.

Allard took up wheelchair basketball in 1995 as part of her rehabilitation, and within weeks was playing competitively. She is classified as a 1.5 point player. She joined Team Canada in 2007, and played her first international game, against Argentina in a Four Nations tournament in Sydney in 2009, at which Canada won bronze. This was followed by winning silver at the 2010 Wheelchair Basketball World Championship in Birmingham, and then gold at the 2010 BT Paralympic World Cup. She also won silver medals at the 2007 Parapan American Games in Rio de Janeiro, Brazil, and at the 2011 Parapan American Games in Guadalajara, Mexico.

"After becoming a part of the women's national team program and participating at a few international tournaments," she recalled, "it was clear to me that my goal was to become a part of this amazing team. Ultimately, my goal was to represent Canada at the Paralympic Games." Her dream came true when she represented Canada at the 2012 Summer Paralympic Games in London. She was part of the team that won a gold medal at the 2014 Women's World Wheelchair Basketball Championship in Toronto in July 2014, and silver at the 2015 Parapan American Games in August 2015, but was omitted from the team for the 2016 Paralympic Games in Rio de Janeiro due to injury.

Awards
 Queen Elizabeth II Diamond Jubilee Medal (2013)

References

1977 births
Canadian women's wheelchair basketball players
Living people
Paralympic wheelchair basketball players of Canada
Sportspeople from Montreal
Wheelchair basketball players at the 2012 Summer Paralympics
Royal Bank of Canada people